A New Testament Lectionary is a handwritten copy of a lectionary, or book of New Testament Bible readings. Lectionaries may be written in majuscule or minuscule Greek letters, on parchment, papyrus, vellum, or paper.

Lectionaries which have the Gospels readings are called Evangeliaria or Evangelistaria, those which have the Acts or Epistles, Apostoli or Praxapostoli. They appear from the 6th century.

Gregory in 1909 enumerated 2234 lectionaries. To the present day 2484 lectionary manuscripts have been catalogued by the (INTF) in Münster.

Below is the list of lectionary 501 to 1000.
For other related lists, see:
List of New Testament lectionaries
List of New Testament lectionaries (1–500)
List of New Testament lectionaries (1001–1500)
List of New Testament lectionaries (1501–2000)

Legend 
 The numbers (#) are the now standard system of Caspar René Gregory (Gregory–Aland). 
 Dates are estimated to the nearest century (except lectionaries dated by scribes which are shown in the Date column). 
 Content only the Gospel lessons (Evangelistarion), and other lessons from the rest of the NT apart from Revelation (Apostolos). Sometimes the surviving portion of a codex is so limited that specific books, chapters or even verses can be indicated. Linked articles, where they exist, generally specify content in detail, by verse.
 Digital images are referenced with direct links to the hosting web pages. The quality and accessibility of the images is as follows:

Contents Legend:
† Indicates the manuscript has damaged or missing pages.
P Indicates only a portion of the original book remains. 
K Indicates manuscript also includes commentary notes.
sel Indicates contents include Scripture readings for selected days only.
e Indicates contents include weekday Scripture readings.
esk Indicates contents include weekday Scripture readings from Easter to Pentecost and Saturday/Sunday readings for other weeks.
sk Indicates contents include only Saturday and Sunday Scripture readings.
Lit Indicates Liturgical book containing an assortment of New Testament texts.
PsO Indicates a Psalter with Biblical Odes.
[ ] Brackets around Gregory-Aland number indicate the number is no longer is use.

Script Legend:
ΑΩ indicates Majuscule script
αω indicates Minuscule script
PU indicates manuscript is a palimpsest and script is the text under the later script.
PO indicates manuscript is a palimpsest and script is the text over the prior script.

List of named or notable lectionaries 
<onlyinclude>

Lectionaries 501–600

Lectionaries 601–700

Lectionaries 701–800

Lectionaries 801–900

Lectionaries 901–1000

{| class="wikitable sortable" style="text-align:center"
!#!!Date!!Contents!!Script!!Pages!!Institution!!City, State!!Country!!Images
|-
|rowspan=2|ℓ 901
|rowspan=2| 12th
|rowspan=2| Gospels + ApostlesLit
|rowspan=2| αω
| 322
| Saint Catherine's Monastery, Gr. 754
| Sinai
| Egypt
| bgcolor="lightgray"| CSNTM
|-
| 1
| Russian National Library, Gr. 405
| Saint Petersburg
| Russia
|
|-
| ℓ 902
| 13th
| Gospels + ApostlesLit
| αω
| 307
| Saint Catherine's Monastery, Gr. 756
| Sinai
| Egypt
| bgcolor="lightgray"| CSNTM
|-
| ℓ 903
| 13th
| Gospels + ApostlesLit
| αω
| 166
| Saint Catherine's Monastery, Gr. 775
| Sinai
| Egypt
| bgcolor="lightgray"| CSNTM
|-
| ℓ 904
| 13th
| †Gospels + ApostlesLit
| αω
| 268
| Saint Catherine's Monastery, Gr. 796
| Sinai
| Egypt
| bgcolor="lightgray"| CSNTM
|-
| ℓ 905
| 14th
| Gospels + ApostlesLit
| αω
| 107
| Saint Catherine's Monastery, Gr. 1042
| Sinai
| Egypt
| 
|-
| ℓ 906
| 14th
| Gospels + ApostlesLit
| αω
| 254
| Saint Catherine's Monastery, Gr. 800
| Sinai
| Egypt
| 
|-
|rowspan=2| ℓ 907
|rowspan=2| 9th
|rowspan=2| Gospelsesk
|rowspan=2| ΑΩ PU
| 82
| Saint Catherine's Monastery, Gr. 929
| Sinai
| Egypt
| bgcolor="lightgray"| CSNTM
|-
| 1
| Russian National Library, Gr. 372
| Saint Petersburg
| Russia
|
|-
| ℓ 908
| 1697
| GospelsLit
| αω
| 80
| Saint Catherine's Monastery, Gr. 943
| Sinai
| Egypt
| 
|-
|rowspan=2| ℓ 909
|rowspan=2| 10th
|rowspan=2| Gospels + ApostlesLit
|rowspan=2| αω
| 86
| Saint Catherine's Monastery, Gr. 957
| Sinai
| Egypt
| bgcolor="lightgray"| CSNTM
|-
| 82
| Russian National Library, Gr. 418
| Saint Petersburg
| Russia
|
|-
| ℓ 910
| 13th
| Gospels + ApostlesLit
| αω PO
| 155
| Saint Catherine's Monastery, Gr. 960
| Sinai
| Egypt
| bgcolor="lightgray"| CSNTM
|-
| ℓ 911
| 12th
| Gospels + ApostlesLit
| αω
| 100
| Saint Catherine's Monastery, Gr. 961
| Sinai
| Egypt
| bgcolor="lightgray"| CSNTM
|-
| ℓ 912
| 12th
| Gospels + ApostlesLit
| αω
| 202
| Saint Catherine's Monastery, Gr. 962
| Sinai
| Egypt
| bgcolor="lightgray"| CSNTM
|-
| ℓ 913
| 14th
| Gospels + ApostlesLit
| αω
| 53
| Saint Catherine's Monastery,  Gr. 965
| Sinai
| Egypt
| 
|-
|rowspan=2| ℓ 914
|rowspan=2| 1426
|rowspan=2| Gospels + ApostlesLit
|rowspan=2| αω
| 489
| Saint Catherine's Monastery, Gr. 968
| Sinai
| Egypt
| bgcolor="lightgray"| CSNTM
|-
| 1
| Russian National Library, Gr. 323
| Saint Petersburg
| Russia
|
|-
| ℓ 915
| 15th
| Gospels + ApostlesLit
| αω
| 430
| Saint Catherine's Monastery, Gr. 972
| Sinai
| Egypt
| 
|-
|rowspan=2| ℓ 916
|rowspan=2| 12th
|rowspan=2| Gospels + ApostlesLit
|rowspan=2| αω
| 168
| Saint Catherine's Monastery, Gr. 973
| Sinai
| Egypt
| bgcolor="lightgray"| CSNTM
|-
| 1
| Russian National Library, Gr. 418
| Saint Petersburg
| Russia
|
|-
| ℓ 917
| 15th
| Gospels + ApostlesLit
| αω
| 495
| Saint Catherine's Monastery, Gr. 977
| Sinai
| Egypt
| 
|-
| ℓ 918
| 14th
| Gospels + ApostlesLit
| αω
| 294
| Saint Catherine's Monastery, Gr. 981
| Sinai
| Egypt
| 
|-
| ℓ 919
| 14th
| Gospels + ApostlesLit
| αω
| 211
| Saint Catherine's Monastery, Gr. 982
| Sinai
| Egypt
| 
|-
| ℓ 920
| 15th
| Gospels + ApostlesLit
| αω
| 140
| Saint Catherine's Monastery, Gr. 986
| Sinai
| Egypt
| 
|-
| ℓ 921
| 12th
| Apostlese
| αω
| 234
| Ecumenical Patriarchate, Chalki, Kamariotissis, 59
| Istanbul
| Turkey
| bgcolor="tan"| CSNTM
|-
| ℓ 922
| 11th
| GospelsP
| αω
| 1
| Bodleian Library, E. D. Clarke 9, fol. III. 182 (fol. 1-181: 383)
| Oxford
| United Kingdom
| 
|-
| ℓ 923
| 
| Gospels + ApostlesP
| αω
| 
| Owner Unknown
| 
| 
| bgcolor="powderblue"| 
|-
| ℓ 924
| 12th
| Gospels + ApostlesLit
| αω
| 166
| Vatican Library, Reg. gr. 54
| Vatican City
| Vatican City
| 
|-
| ℓ 925
| 17th
| GospelsLit
| αω
| 65
| Marciana National Library, Gr. II,188 (1402)
| Venice
| Italy
| 
|-
| ℓ 926
| 12th
| GospelsP
| αω PU
| 26
| British Library, Add MS 10068
| London
| United Kingdom
|bgcolor="sandybrown"|BL
|-
| ℓ 927
| 14th
| Gospels + ApostlesLit
| αω
| 270
| British Library, Add MS 24378
| London
| United Kingdom
|bgcolor="sandybrown"|BL
|-
| ℓ 928
| 13th
| John 5:24-45
| αω
| 1
| National Library, Supplement Grec 179.180, fol. 79
| Paris
| France
| bgcolor="lightgray"| INTF
|-
| ℓ 929
| 12th
| Gospels + ApostlesLit
| αω
| 26
| Union Theological Seminary The Burke Library, UTS MS 041
| New York, NY
| United States
|bgcolor="wheat"| UC
|-
| ℓ 930
| 13th
| †Gospelse
| αω
| 230
| British Library, Add MS 19459
| London
| United Kingdom
|bgcolor="sandybrown"|BL
|-
| ℓ 931
| 15th
| Gospels + Apostlesk
| αω
| 75
| Marciana National Library, Gr. II,130 (1173)
| Venice
| Italy
| 
|-
| ℓ 932
| 13th
| GospelsPsO
| αω
| 117
| British Library, Add MS 40656
| London
| United Kingdom
|bgcolor="sandybrown"|BL
|-
| ℓ 933
| 13th
| Gospelsk-K
| αω
| 142
|Vallicelliana Library, C. 7
| Rome
| Italy
| 
|-
| ℓ 934
| 966
| GospelsPsO-K
| αω
| 222
| Russian National Library, Gr. 64
| Saint Petersburg
| Russia
| 
|-
| ℓ 935
| 12th
| Gospels + ApostlesLit
| αω
| 478
| National Library, Grec 13
| Paris
| France
| 
|-
| ℓ 936
| 13th
| Gospels + ApostlesLit
| αω
| 200
| National Library, Grec 263
| Paris
| France
| bgcolor="lightgray"| BnF
|-
| ℓ 937
| 13th
| Gospels + ApostlesLit
| αω
| 70
| Owner Unknown
| 
| 
| bgcolor="powderblue"| 
|-
| ℓ 938
| 13th
| Apostlese
| αω
| 239
| Ecumenical Patriarchate, Kamariotissis 74 (71)
| Istanbul
| Turkey
| bgcolor="tan"| CSNTM
|-
| ℓ 939
| 12th
| Gospelsesk
| αω
| 238
| British Library, Add MS 34059
| London
| United Kingdom
|bgcolor="sandybrown"|BL
|-
| ℓ 940
| 13th
| GospelsLit
| αω
| 147
| British Library, Egerton MS 2743
| London
| United Kingdom
|bgcolor="sandybrown"|BL
|-
| ℓ 941
| 12th
| †Gospelsesk
| αω
| 165
| British Library, Egerton MS 2745
| London
| United Kingdom
|bgcolor="sandybrown"|BL
|-
| ℓ 942
| 12th
| Gospelssel
| αω
| 210
| Topkapi Palace Museum, 21
| Istanbul
| Turkey
| 
|-
| ℓ 943
| 14th
| Gospelsesk
| αω
| 295
| Russian National Library, Gr. 185
| Saint Petersburg
| Russia
| 
|-
| ℓ 944
| 10th
| Gospelsesk
| αω
| 198
| National and University Library, Ms. 1.895
| Strasbourg
| France
| bgcolor="sandybrown"| INTF
|-
| ℓ 945
| 15th/16th
| Gospels + ApostlesLit
| αω
| 390
| Jagiellonian Library, Graec. qu. 17
| Krakow
| Poland
| 
|-
|rowspan=2| ℓ 946
|rowspan=2| 10th
|rowspan=2| GospelsP
|rowspan=2| αω
| 2
| Berlin State Library, Graec. fol. 29
| Berlin
| Germany
| 
|-
| 3
| Saint Catherine's Monastery, N. E. Σπ. ΜΓ 26
| Sinai
| Egypt
| 
|-
| ℓ 947
| 12th
| Gospelsesk
| αω
| 284
| Gesamthochschul Library, 2° Ms. theol. 61
| Kassel
| Germany
| 
|-
| ℓ 948
| 12th
| GospelsP
| αω
| 12
| University Library, Cod. Gr. 18 8 
| Leipzig
| Germany
| 
|-
| ℓ 949
| 13th
| †Gospelsesk
| αω
| 159
| University Library, Gr. 68
|Uppsala
| Sweden
|bgcolor="sandybrown"|UU
|-
| ℓ 950
| 13th
| Gospelse
| αω
| 210
| University Library, Gr. 69
|Uppsala
| Sweden
|bgcolor="sandybrown"|UU
|-
| ℓ 951
| 12th
| Gospelse
| αω
| 247
| Drew University Rose Memorial Library, Ms. 6
| Madison, NJ
| United States
| bgcolor="sandybrown"| CSNTM
|-
| ℓ 952
| 12th
| †Gospelsesk
| αω
| 175
| Drew University Rose Memorial Library, Ms. 7
| Madison, NJ
| United States
| bgcolor="sandybrown"| CSNTM
|-
| ℓ 953
| 16th
| GospelsP
| αω
| 13
| Drew University Rose Memorial Library, Ms. 8
| Madison, NJ
| United States
| bgcolor="sandybrown"| CSNTM
|-
| ℓ 954=[ℓ 2361]
| 14th
| Gospelsesk
| αω
| 334
| Owner Unknown
| 
| 
| bgcolor="lightgray"| INTF
|-
| ℓ 955
| 13th
| Gospelsesk
| αω
| 238
| Brown University, John Hay Library, Ms. Greek 1
| Providence, RI
| United States
| 
|-
| ℓ 956
| 15th
| Gospelse
| αω
| 180
| The New York Public Library, Rare Books and Manuscripts Division, MA 102
| New York, NY
| United States
| bgcolor="sandybrown"| CSNTM
|-
| ℓ 957
| 16th
| GospelsP
| αω
| 10
| National Library, Supplement Grec 1105
| Paris
| France
|bgcolor="lightgray"|BnF
|-
| ℓ 958
| 13th
| Gospelse
| αω
| 232
| National Library, Supplement Grec 1267
| Paris
| France
|bgcolor="lightgray"|BnF
|-
| ℓ 959
| 15th
| Gospels + ApostlesLit
| αω
| 379
| National Library, Supplement Grec 1272
| Paris
| France
|bgcolor="lightgray"|BnF
|-
| ℓ 960
| 15th
| Gospels + ApostlesLit
| αω
| 410
| Municipal Library, Ms. 1204, Ms. 1204
| Troyes
| France
| 
|-
| ℓ 961
| 12th
| GospelsP
| ΑΩ
| 7
| National Library, Copt. 129,7, fol. 51, 56; 8, fol. 136; 9, fol. 74; 10, fol. 193; fol. 83, 84
| Paris
| France
| 
|-
|rowspan=3| ℓ 962
|rowspan=3| 11th
|rowspan=3| GospelsP
|rowspan=3| ΑΩ
| 3
| Vatican Library, Borg. copt. 109
| Vatican City
| Vatican City
| 
|-
| 1
| Musée du Louvre, E. 10039b
| Paris
|France
| 
|-
| 2
| National Library, Copt. 129,19, fol. 35f.
| Paris
| France
| 
|-
|rowspan=3| ℓ 963+[ℓ 1614']+[0100]
|rowspan=3| 9th
|rowspan=3| GospelsP
|rowspan=3| ΑΩ
| 4
| University of Michigan Library, Ms. 124
| Ann Arbor, MI
| United States
| bgcolor="sandybrown"| CSNTM
|-
| 1
| Bodleian Library, Copt. f. 160 (P)
| Oxford
| United Kingdom
| 
|-
| 5
| National Library, Copt. 129,10, fol. 196; 19, fol. 57; Copt. 133,1, fol. 89, 98, 98b
| Paris
| France
| 
|-
| ℓ 964| 13th
| GospelsP
| ΑΩ
| 1
| National Library, Copt. 129,19, fol. 65
| Paris
| France
| 
|-
|rowspan=2| ℓ 965 + [0114]
|rowspan=2| 9th
|rowspan=2| GospelsP
|rowspan=2| ΑΩ
| 7
| National Library, Copt. 129,10; 21, fol. 1-4, 10; Copt. 133,1, fol. 50
| Paris
| France
| 
|-
| 1
| Austrian National Library, Pap. K. 9673a
| Vienna
| Austria
| 
|-
| ℓ 966| 12th
| Gospelsesk
| αω
| 376
| Marciana National Library, Gr. I,64 (437)
| Venice
| Italy
| 
|-
| ℓ 967| 10th
| Gospels
| αω
| 
| Owner Unknown
| 
| 
| bgcolor="powderblue"|
|-
|rowspan=2| ℓ 968|rowspan=2|  12th
|rowspan=2|  
|rowspan=2| αω
| 24
| National Library, Suppl. Gr. 185, fol. 154-177 (fol. 1-39.68-153: 120)
| Paris
| France
| 
|-
| 6
| University Library, B. P. Gr. 96
| Leiden
| Netherlands
| 
|-
| ℓ 969| 
| 
| αω
| 
| Panagia Hozoviotissa Monastery
| Amorgos
| Greece
| 
|-
| ℓ 970| 
| 
| αω
| 
| Panagia Hozoviotissa Monastery
| Amorgos
| Greece
| 
|-
| ℓ 971| 1043
| †Gospelsesk
| αω
| 232
| Russian State Library, F.270.1a.6 (Gr. 16)
| Moscow
| Russia
| bgcolor="lightgray"| CSNTM
|-
| ℓ 972| 11th
| †Gospelsesk
| αω
| 208
| Russian State Library, F.270 07 (gr. 17)
| Moscow
| Russia
| 
|-
| ℓ 973| 12th
| Gospelsesk
| αω
| 271
| Russian State Library, F.270 09 (gr. 18)
| Moscow
| Russia
| 
|-
| ℓ 974| 13th
| GospelsP
| αω
| 60
| Russian State Library, F.270 11 (gr. 20)
| Moscow
| Russia
| 
|-
| ℓ 975| 13th
| †Gospelse
| αω
| 204
| Russian State Library, F.270 12 (gr. 19)
| Moscow
| Russia
| 
|-
| ℓ 976| 1320
| †Gospelse
| αω
| 226
| Russian State Library, F.270 13 (gr. 21)
| Moscow
| Russia
| 
|-
| ℓ 977| 14th
| †Gospels + Apostlesk
| αω
| 133
| Russian State Library, F.270 14 (gr. 22)
| Moscow
| Russia
| 
|-
| ℓ 978| 13th
| †Gospels + Apostles
| αω
| 140
| Zoodochos Pigi Monastery (Hagias), 22
| Andros
| Greece
| 
|-
| ℓ 979| 12th
| Gospelse
| αω
| 408
| Zoodochos Pigi Monastery (Hagias), 85
| Andros
| Greece
| 
|-
| ℓ 980| 11th
| Gospelse
| αω
| 283
| Zoodochos Pigi Monastery (Hagias), 86
| Andros
| Greece
| 
|-
| ℓ 981| 13th
| †Gospelsesk
| αω
| 193
| Zoodochos Pigi Monastery (Hagias), 87
| Andros
| Greece
| 
|-
| ℓ 982| 14th
| †Gospels
| αω
| 321
| Zoodochos Pigi Monastery (Hagias), 90
| Andros
| Greece
| 
|-
| ℓ 983| 13th
| †Gospelsesk
| αω
| 150
| Zoodochos Pigi Monastery (Hagias), 92
| Andros
| Greece
| 
|-
| ℓ 984| 12th
| Gospelsesk
| αω
| 248
| Zoodochos Pigi Monastery (Hagias), 95
| Andros
| Greece
| 
|-
| ℓ 985| 12th
| †Gospelse
| αω
| 322
| Zoodochos Pigi Monastery (Hagias), 97
| Andros
| Greece
| 
|-
| ℓ 986| 13th
| Gospelse
| αω
| 195
| Zoodochos Pigi Monastery (Hagias), 103
| Andros
| Greece
| 
|-
| ℓ 987| 12th
| Gospelse
| αω
| 304
| Augusteum und Lutherhaus, S. 143/2878
| Wittenberg
| Germany
| 
|-
| ℓ 988| 12th
| Gospelssk
| αω
| 187
| Monastery of St. John the Theologian, 11
| Antissa, Lesbos
| Greece
| 
|-
| ℓ 989| 12th
| Gospelsesk
| αω
| 110
| Monastery of St. John the Theologian, 12
| Antissa, Lesbos
| Greece
| 
|-
| ℓ 990| 1565
| Gospelse
| αω
| 375
| Plomari Club Benjamin, MS 498
| Lesbos
| Greece
| bgcolor="tan"| CSNTM
|-
| ℓ 991| 10th/11th
| Gospelse
| αω
| 335
| Patriarchate of Jerusalem, Taphu 33
| Jerusalem
| Israel
| bgcolor="lightgray"| CSNTM
|-
| ℓ 992| 1762
| Gospelse
| αω
| 115
| Patriarchate of Jerusalem, Taphu 105
| Jerusalem
| Israel
| bgcolor="lightgray"| CSNTM
|-
| ℓ 993| 17th
| GospelsP
| αω
| 49
| Patriarchate of Jerusalem, Taphu 161
| Jerusalem
| Israel
| bgcolor="lightgray"| CSNTM
|-
| ℓ 994| 1502
| Gospelsesk
| αω
| 108
| Patriarchate of Jerusalem, Taphu 526
| Jerusalem
| Israel
| bgcolor="lightgray"| CSNTM
|-
|rowspan=2| ℓ 995|rowspan=2| 11th
|rowspan=2| Gospelse
|rowspan=2| αω
| 294
| Patriarchate of Jerusalem, Saba 12
| Jerusalem
| Israel
| bgcolor="lightgray"| CSNTM
|-
| 2
| Russian National Library, Gr. 304
| Saint Petersburg
| Russia
| 
|-
| ℓ 996| 11th
| Gospelsesk
| αω
| 207
| Patriarchate of Jerusalem, Saba 23
| Jerusalem
| Israel
| bgcolor="lightgray"| CSNTM
|-
| ℓ 997| 12th
| Gospelse
| αω
| 225
| Patriarchate of Jerusalem, Saba 40
| Jerusalem
| Israel
| bgcolor="lightgray"| CSNTM
|-
| ℓ 998| 14th
| †Gospelsesk
| αω
| 318
| Patriarchate of Jerusalem, Saba 58
| Jerusalem
| Israel
| bgcolor="lightgray"| CSNTM
|-bgcolor="white"|
|[ℓ 999] = ℓ 1408| 
| 
| 
| 
| 
| 
| 
| 
|-
| ℓ 1000| 11th
| †Gospelsesk
| αω
| 163
| Patriarchate of Jerusalem, Saba 82
| Jerusalem
| Israel
| bgcolor="lightgray"| CSNTM
|}</onlyinclude>

 See also 

 Lists 
 Categories of New Testament manuscripts 
 List of New Testament papyri 
 List of New Testament uncials 
 List of New Testament minuscules
 List of New Testament Latin manuscripts 
 Articles 
 Novum Testamentum Graece 
 Biblical manuscript 
 Palaeography 
 Textual criticism

 References 

 Bibliography 
 Dr. Peter M. Head. The Early Greek Bible Manuscript Project: New Testament Lectionary Manuscripts. 
 K. Aland, M. Welte, B. Köster, K. Junack, Kurzgefasste Liste der griechischen Handschriften des Neuen Testaments, Walter de Gruyter, Berlin, New York 1994, pp. 219 ff.  
  
 Seid, Timothy. "A Table of Greek Manuscripts" . Interpreting Ancient Manuscripts. Retrieved June 22, 2007. 
 Black M., Aland K., Die alten Übersetzungen des Neuen Testaments, die Kirchenväterzitate und Lektionare: der gegenwärtige Stand ihrer Erforschung und ihre Bedeutung für die griechische Textgeschichte, Wissenschaftliche Beirat des Instituts für neutestamentliche Textforschung, Berlin 1972.
 Carroll D. Osburn, The Greek Lectionaries of the New Testament, in. The Text of the New Testament in Contemporary Research, ed. Bart D. Ehrman and Michael W. Holmes, William B. Eerdmans Publishing Company, Grand Rapids 1995, pp. 61–74.

 External links 
 International recording list for Greek manuscripts of the New Testament Continuation list, Institute for New Testament Textual Research (INTF), Munster
 "Continuation of the Manuscript List" INTF'', University of Münster. Retrieved September 8, 2009
 
 Lectionaries at the Encyclopedia of Textual Criticism
 New Testament Lectionary Manuscripts

New Testament lectionaries
Greek New Testament manuscripts